theWord (previously known as In The Beginning Was The Word) is a free Bible study software application for Microsoft Windows.  It was first released in 2003 and developed by Costas Stergiou. It offers Bibles, commentaries, dictionaries, general books, maps, search capabilities, and support for Bibles in several languages.

Features

theWord supports the following features:

 Ability to quickly search through Bible texts and annotations
 Support for non-Bible resources (commentaries, dictionaries, generic books)
 Compare/Parallel view
 Ability to create and edit complete user modules of any kind (dictionary, commentary, maps, etc.)
 Cross references (either embedded in Bible texts, or user defined)
 Hyperlinking in modules to Bibles, internal locations, or other modules
 Clipboard to display the text of copied verse references
 Inline commentaries and word lookup dictionaries
 Support for right to left languages
 Support for Strong's Numbers, Greek morphological codes, and numerous other viewer options
 Support for footnotes
 Support for non-Bible documents (commentaries, dictionaries, generic books)
 Greek and Hebrew support
 Library search capabilities
 User markups and highlighting
 Verse lists
 Support for purchasing copyrighted, priced modules

Version history

 Version 1.0: First non-beta release, Clipboard Monitor feature introduced
 Version 1.1: Ability to print Bible texts and personal notes, and export personal notes in various formats
 Version 1.2: Improved Greek support in non-Greek environments
 Version 2.0: Multiple Bible windows, Bible text formatting, dockable windows and layouts
 Version 3.0: Integration of non-Bible resources with search capabilities, priced copyrighted modules, user-created modules
 Version 4.0: New program icon, first alpha implementation of hybrid modules (books and commentaries), new default tw4 theme
 Version 5.0: Integrated module downloader (ability to browse and install any module directly from within theWord without downloading the modules separately from the official site).
 Version 6.0: Spell Check for user-created modules and enhancement of search capabilities

Importer tool

theWord Importer Tool is used for importing  Unbound Bible, Zefania XML, and free e-Sword modules and using them in theWord. The Importer Tool does not allow importing of modules purchased from e-Sword.

theWord Portable

theWord portable is a portable version of theWord that can be installed to a USB flash drive. The installer is included in the main installer of version 3.0, which gives the option of installing as portable.

References

External links
 

Electronic Bibles
2003 in Christianity